Debora Silvestri (born 8 May 1998) is an Italian professional racing cyclist, who currently rides for UCI Women's Continental Team .

Major results
2018
 7th Road race, National Road Championships
2020
 9th Giro dell'Emilia Internazionale Donne Elite
2021
 3rd Grand Prix Féminin de Chambéry
 4th Overall Setmana Ciclista Valenciana
2022
 6th Gran Premio della Liberazione

References

External links

1998 births
Living people
Italian female cyclists
Cyclists from the Province of Verona